Ignorance management is a knowledge management practice that addresses the concept of ignorance in organizations.

Overview
Logically, ignorance management is based upon the concept of ignorance. John Israilidis, Russell Lock, and Louise Cooke of Loughborough University described ignorance management as:

The key principle of this theory is that knowledge management (KM) could better be seen as ignorance management, due to the fact that it is impossible for someone to comprehend and understand everything in a complete way. The only real wisdom is in recognising the limits and extent of one's knowledge, and therefore KM is essentially a matter of sharing the extent of one's ignorance with other people, and thus learning together. This process of knowing what is needed to know, and also acknowledging the power of understanding the unknown, could develop a tacit understanding and could improve both short-term opportunistic value capture and longer term business sustainability.

Research
Several attempts have been made to explore the value of managing organisational ignorance in order to prevent failures within knowledge transfer contexts. The need to recognise the role and significance of power in the management of ignorance has been introduced to further enhance such efforts. Also, a growing body of psychology research shows that humans find it intrinsically difficult to get a sense of what we don’t know, and argues that incompetence deprives people of the ability to recognise their own incompetence (the Dunning–Kruger effect). The viewpoint of developing our understanding of organisational ignorance can yield impressive benefits, if successfully incorporated within a company’s KM strategy.

See also
 Ignoramus et ignorabimus
 I know that I know nothing
 There are known knowns
 Unknown known
 Agnatology

References

Further reading
 
 
 
 
 
 

Information systems
Ignorance